Alive in Torment is a live limited shape EP by the Norwegian Symphonic black metal band Dimmu Borgir. It was recorded in Stuttgart, Germany on 4 April 2001, during the tour supporting their fifth studio album Puritanical Euphoric Misanthropia.

Track listing

Personnel
Shagrath – lead vocals
Silenoz – rhythm guitar
Galder – lead guitar
Nicholas Barker – drums
ICS Vortex – bass, clean vocals
Mustis – synthesizers, piano

References

2001 EPs
Dimmu Borgir albums
Nuclear Blast EPs